Miss India Worldwide India is a national beauty pageant in India that sends its winner to Miss India Worldwide. The incumbent titleholder is Apeksha Porwal from Mumbai who was 1st runner up in Miss India Worldwide 2015 held in Mumbai, India

History
India has been participating in Miss India Worldwide pageant since its inception in 1990.

The Pageant
Karminder Kaur Virk became first Indian as well as Asian delegate to win Miss India Worldwide pageant in 1994.
In 1996 Sandhya Chib won Miss India Worldwide and became second Indian delegate to win the crown. India has won five Miss India Worldwide crowns Karminder Kaur Virk(1994), Sandhya Chib(1996), Aarti Chabaria(1999), Purva Merchant(2003), Shagun Sarabhai(2008).

Titleholders

 Apeksha Porwal was Femina Miss India Delhi 2015 and was selected by Femina miss india 2015

Winners Notes
 Karminder Kaur Virk became 1st runner up in Femina Miss India 1993 and participated in Miss World 1993.
 Sandhya Chib won Femina Miss India 1996 & participated in Miss Universe 1996. She was Top 10 finalist at the Miss Universe 1996 competition.
 Ritu Singh later won Femina Miss India World title in 1991 and represented India at Miss World 1991 where she was among top 6 finalists.
 Miss India Worldwide India 2014 - 2nd Runner Up, Audrey D'silva later participated in Indian Princess beauty pageant held in Rangsit University in Thailand and was crowned Best Body award winner.

See also
 Femina Miss India

References

Beauty pageants in India
Indian awards